The Cyprus Women's Cup is a global invitational tournament for national teams in women's football. It has been held annually in Cyprus since 2008. Although the competition takes place in Cyprus, the hosts have yet to take part in the competition.

It is played in late February or early March, at the same time as the Algarve Cup, the Arnold Clark Cup, the Cup of Nations, the Istria Cup, the Pinatar Cup, the SheBelieves Cup, the Tournoi de France, the Turkish Women's Cup and the Women's Revelations Cup.

Format
The Cyprus Women's  Cup uses the following two-phase format:

The first phase is a group stage in which the twelve invited teams are divided into three groups of four teams. Similar to the Algarve Cup, the teams in Group A and Group B consist of higher-ranked teams and are the only teams actually in contention for the championship; Group C consists of lower-ranked teams. Each group plays a round-robin of six games, with each team playing one match against each of the other teams in the same group.

The second phase is a single "finals day" in which six games involving all twelve teams are played to determine the tournament's final standings, with the match-ups as follows:

11th place match: 3rd best 4th placed team vs. 2nd best 4th placed team
9th place match: Best 4th placed team vs. 3rd best 3rd placed team
7th place match: 2nd best 3rd placed team vs. best 3rd placed team
5th place match: 3rd best 2nd placed team vs. 2nd best 2nd placed team
3rd place match: 3rd best group winner vs. best 2nd placed team
Final: Best group winner vs. 2nd best group winner

Results

Teams reaching the top four

Participating nations

General statistics
As of 2018

References

External links
 
Cyprus Women's Cup, RSSSF.com 
Cyprus Women's Cup on WomensSoccerUnited.com

 
International association football competitions in Europe
International association football competitions hosted by Cyprus
Women's football competitions in Cyprus
Recurring sporting events established in 2008
International women's association football invitational tournaments
2008 establishments in Cyprus